Malcolm Perewari Ebiowei (born 4 September 2003) is an English professional footballer who plays as a midfielder for Hull City on loan from Crystal Palace. He has also been deployed as a forward.

Club career
Initially signed by Chelsea at the age of five, Ebiowei would go on to represent the Arsenal and Rangers academies. He joined Derby County in 2021.

Ebiowei made his senior debut on 8 February 2022 when he came on as a substitute in the 93rd minute of a 3–1 win against Hull City, replacing Luke Plange. On 30 April 2022, Ebiowei scored a first senior goal when he gave already relegated Derby the lead in a 2–0 victory away at Blackpool.

On 26 June 2022, Ebiowei agreed to join Premier League club Crystal Palace on a five-year contract from the expiration of his Derby County contract on 1 July. He made his club debut in the opening match of the 2022–23 season as an 86th-minute substitute for Eberechi Eze.

On 19 January 2023, Ebiowei joined Hull City on loan for the remainder of the 2022–23 season.

International career
Ebiowei is of Nigerian descent and has represented the Netherlands and England at youth international level. He featured in two under-15 games for the Netherlands, both against Italy, and one game for the England under-16s against Turkey.

On 21 September 2022, Ebiowei made his England U20 debut as a substitute during a 3–0 victory over Chile at the Pinatar Arena.

Career statistics

Club
.

Notes

References

2003 births
Living people
English footballers
England youth international footballers
Dutch footballers
Netherlands youth international footballers
English people of Nigerian descent
Dutch people of Nigerian descent
Association football midfielders
Chelsea F.C. players
Arsenal F.C. players
Rangers F.C. players
Derby County F.C. players
Crystal Palace F.C. players
Hull City A.F.C. players
English Football League players
Premier League players